Rubberband is a Miles Davis album, recorded in 1985 and released on Rhino Records and Warner Records on September 6, 2019. The album has received mixed to positive reviews.

Recording and Rubberband EP 
After leaving long-time record label Columbia Records, Davis went to Warner Bros. Although the 1985 album was not released in Davis' lifetime, sections of the song "Give It Up" were sampled posthumously for the track "High Speed Chase", from Davis' final album, Doo-Bop, in 1992.

In 2018, an EP of takes of the title track entitled Rubberband EP was released:
"Rubberband of Life" (Radio Edit) – 4:22
"Rubberband of Life" – 5:44
"Rubberband of Life" (Instrumental) – 5:44
"Rubberband" – 6:12
"Rubberband of Life" (Amerigo Gazaway Remix) – 4:41

Versions of "Rubberband of Life" feature vocalist Ledisi.

Critical reception 
 These mixed views may in part stem from a divergent opinion of Davis' 1980s recordings as a whole. As music journalist Rob Shepherd, a fan of the artist's works from that decade, has noted: "Recorded mostly in 1985, the height of Miles Davis’ most critically maligned era, Rubberband is unlikely to be appreciated by one who generally disfavors the artist’s 1980s oeuvre. However, for a listener open to Davis’ music from that period, there is much to enjoy."

Track listing 
"Rubberband of Life" – 5:43
"This Is It" – 4:36
"Paradise" – 6:10
"So Emotional" – 5:18
"Give It Up" – 6:28
"Maze" – 4:11
"Carnival Time" – 4:24
"I Love What We Make Together" – 5:05
"See I See" – 4:19
"Echoes in Time"/"The Wrinkle" – 9:25
"Rubberband" – 6:10

Personnel 
Miles Davis – trumpet, keyboards, synthesizers, bandleader

Additional musicians
Randy Hall – on "I Love What We Make Together", production on 1985 sessions
Lalah Hathaway – vocals on "So Emotional"
Ledisi – vocals on "Rubberband of Life"
Michael Paulo – tenor, alto, flute 
Mike Stern – lead guitar on “Rubberband"

Technical personnel
Zane Giles – production on 1985 sessions
Vince Wilburn, Jr. – production for 2019 release

Charts

References

External links 

Rubberband at RateYourMusic

2019 albums
Miles Davis albums
Rhino Records albums
Warner Records albums
Albums produced by Randy Hall